Michael Richter may refer to:

Michael M. Richter (1938–2020), German mathematician
Mike Richter (born 1966), American hockey player